El Robespierre Español (Spanish: The Spanish Robespierre) was a political magazine with the subtitle, amigo de las leyes: o questiones atrevidas sobre la España. Although it was published just for one year from 1811 to 1812, the magazine is significant being the first Spanish magazine which was edited by a woman, María del Carmen Silva.

History and profile
The first issue of El Robespierre Español which was irregularly published appeared in March 1811. Fernández Sardino, husband of Carmen Silva, was the founder of the magazine and had been also the editor-in-chief, but he was arrested due to his alleged anti-patriotic activities during the War of Independence. Then Carmen Silva assumed the post. The magazine was based in Isla de León, today Cadiz.

El Robespierre Español adopted an Aristotelian approach towards revolution and described it as a “declaration of public opinion through deeds.” This definition was given in the magazine as a reason for the overthrow of the despotic governments in that such governments had been ruled without taking into consideration the public opinion. The magazine folded in July 1812.

References

External links

1811 establishments in Spain
1812 disestablishments in Spain
Defunct political magazines published in Spain
Irregularly published magazines
Magazines established in 1811
Magazines disestablished in 1812
Mass media in Cádiz
Spanish-language magazines